This page lists Hindi television sitcoms.

List of Hindi Sitcom

See also 
 List of Hindi horror shows 
 List of Hindi thriller shows
 List of Indian animated television series

References

External links
 All times Hindi classic shows
List Of Hindi Comedy Serial

Hindi television content related lists